That's So Raven Too! is the second soundtrack album from the hit Disney Channel original series, That's So Raven. The soundtrack debuted and peaked at #44, on the Billboard 200, selling 22,600 copies in its first week. Since then, the soundtrack has sold 200,000 copies (as of 2007). The soundtrack includes the single "Some Call it Magic" by Raven-Symoné. The album also features songs from other artists such as Jesse McCartney, B5, Everlife, Anneliese van der Pol, Orlando Brown, Aretha Franklin, and Aly & AJ.

Track listing

Notes 
 "Walking on Sunshine" is a cover, originally performed by Katrina and the Waves.
 "A Day in the Sun" is a cover, originally performed by Hilary Duff on her Metamorphosis album (Japanese version).
 "I Can See Clearly Now" is a cover, originally performed by Johnny Nash.
 "Will It Go Round in Circles" is a cover, originally performed by Billy Preston.
 "Let's Groove" is a cover of an Earth, Wind, And Fire song.

Charts

References 

2006 soundtrack albums
Albums produced by Matthew Gerrard
Dance-pop soundtracks
Hip hop soundtracks
Rhythm and blues soundtracks
Television soundtracks
That's So Raven
Walt Disney Records soundtracks